Crosswicks is an unincorporated community located within Chesterfield Township in Burlington County, New Jersey, United States. The area is served as United States Postal Service ZIP code 08515.

As of the 2000 United States Census, the population for ZIP Code Tabulation Area 08515 was 290.

Chesterfield Township comprises three distinct communities: Chesterfield, Crosswicks and Sykesville. The area was first settled in 1677, when a group primarily consisting of Quakers settled in the area of Crosswicks, the oldest of the Chesterfield's three villages.

Crosswicks is home to a Friends Meeting House, as well as a historic library which used to house the Crosswicks Fire Department. The fire department's current home is in the former schoolhouse on New Street, which it has occupied since 1968. The building was completed in 1909. The current engine bay (where trucks are kept) was built in 1914, although the original 1909 cornerstone lies in the new section (it was moved).

The Crosswicks Community Association holds an annual family-style croquet tournament and music festival on the village green in July. There is live music provided by local bands during the day. Food is available from vendors. There are lawn games set up for children.

Geography 

Demographics

See also
Crosswicks Creek

References

External links

Census 2000 Fact Sheet for ZIP Code Tabulation Area 08515 from the United States Census Bureau
Crosswicks Fire Department

1677 establishments in New Jersey
Chesterfield Township, New Jersey
Unincorporated communities in Burlington County, New Jersey
Unincorporated communities in New Jersey